Ubatuba is the eponymous debut album by German jazz saxophonist Ingrid Laubrock's quintet featuring saxophonist Tim Berne, trombonist Ben Gerstein, tuba player Dan Peck and drummer Tom Rainey. It was recorded in 2014 and released on Firehouse 12.

Reception 

The Down Beat review by John Corbett notes "It’s a pleasure to hear Tim Berne’s alto saxophone sounding wonderful in tandem with Laubrock and trombonist Ben Gerstein."

The All About Jazz review by Karl Ackermann states "Ubatuba is an ambitious creation in terms of Laubrock's astoundingly complex writing and in the masterful musicianship from all involved."

In a review for JazzTimes Britt Robson says about Laubrock "Her work in Paradoxical Frog and Anti-House marked her as a force to be reckoned with. Ubatuba ratifies that reputation with unique, tactile music that pricks the senses as much as it piques the intellect."

Track listing 
All compositions by Ingrid Laubrock.
 "Any Breathing Organism" – 10:27
 "Homo Diluvii" – 5:55
 "Hiccups" – 13:23
 "Hall of Mirrors" – 4:15
 "Any Many" – 6:26
 "Hypnic Jerk" – 15:41

Personnel 
Ingrid Laubrock – tenor sax, alto sax
Tim Berne – alto sax
Ben Gerstein – trombone
Dan Peck – tuba
Tom Rainey – drums

References 

 

2015 albums
Ingrid Laubrock albums